Uta Caecilia Merzbach (February 9, 1933 – June 27, 2017) was a German-American historian of mathematics who became the first curator of mathematical instruments at the Smithsonian Institution.

Early life
Merzbach was born in Berlin, where her mother was a philologist and her father was an economist who worked for the Reich Association of Jews in Germany during World War II. The Nazi government closed the association in June 1943; they arrested the family, along with other leading members of the association, and sent them to the Theresienstadt concentration camp on August 4, 1943. The Merzbachs survived the war and the camp, and after living for a year in a refugee camp in Deggendorf they moved to Georgetown, Texas in 1946, where her father found a faculty position at Southwestern University.

Education
After high school in Brownwood, Texas, Merzbach entered Southwestern, but transferred after two years to the University of Texas at Austin, where she graduated in 1952 with a bachelor's degree in mathematics. In 1954, she earned a master's degree there, also in mathematics. Merzbach became a school teacher, but soon returned to graduate study at Harvard University.

She completed her Ph.D. at Harvard in 1965. Her dissertation, Quantity of Structure: Development of Modern Algebraic Concepts from Leibniz to Dedekind, combined mathematics and the history of science; it was jointly supervised by mathematician Garrett Birkhoff and historian of science I. Bernard Cohen.

Career
Merzbach joined the Smithsonian as an associate curator in 1964 (later curator), and served there until 1988 in the National Museum of American History. As well as collecting mathematical objects at the Smithsonian, she also collected interviews with many of the pioneers of computing. In 1991, she co-authored the second edition of A History of Mathematics, originally published in 1968 by Carl Benjamin Boyer. 

After her retirement she returned to Georgetown, Texas, where she died in 2017.

References 

1933 births
2017 deaths
20th-century American mathematicians
21st-century American mathematicians
American women mathematicians
20th-century German mathematicians
American historians of mathematics
University of Texas at Austin College of Natural Sciences alumni
Harvard University alumni
People from Berlin
People from Georgetown, Texas
20th-century women mathematicians
21st-century women mathematicians
Theresienstadt Ghetto survivors
German emigrants to the United States
20th-century American women
21st-century American women
American women curators
German women curators